The Rainbow Group, officially the Rainbow Group: Federation of the Green Alternative European Links, Agalev-Ecolo, the Danish People's Movement against Membership of the European Community, and the European Free Alliance, in the European Parliament was a green and regionalist political group with seats in the European Parliament between 1984 and 1989.

History
The Rainbow Group was formed in 1984 as a coalition of Greens, Regionalists and other parties of the left unaffiliated with any of the international organizations.

The German Greens and the Dutch Green Progressive Alliance were used a principle of rotation used by the Germany and Dutch parties, requiring its MEPs to sit for half their five-year term.

In 1989 the Rainbow Group split. The green parties formed the Green Group, whilst the regionalist parties stayed a continuing Rainbow group, with the shorter official name of the Rainbow Group in the European Parliament.

Member parties

Nomenclature
The formal name of the 1984–1989 Rainbow was "Rainbow Group: Federation of the Green Alternative European Links, Agalev-Ecolo, the Danish People's Movement against Membership of the European Community, and the European Free Alliance, in the European Parliament". This is the longest name of any European Parliament Group to date.

References

1980s in Europe
Former European Parliament party groups
Green politics
Regionalism (politics)